Arturo "Boy" Tiongson Enrile (June 20, 1940 – January 14, 1998) was the Secretary of the Department of Transportation and Communications from 1997 to 1998. He also served as the 24th Chief of Staff of the Armed Forces of the Philippines from 1994 to 1996.

Early life
Enrile was born on June 20, 1940, in Lucena City to Felix Enrile and Jovita Tiongson. He was the cousin of the late former President Corazon Aquino and former Senator Juan Ponce Enrile.

Personal life
He was married to Mara Enrile. And they have a daughter named Tanya.

Career

Military 
Enrile is a graduate of Philippine Military Academy Class of 1962. In 1975, he commanded the newly activated 41st Infantry Battalion under the auspices of 1st Infantry Division of Philippine Army. He was also the first commander of the 1st Army Training Group (1ATG) which was created in 1976 also under the 1st Infantry Division.  He was then appointed as superintendent of the Philippine Military Academy on August 6, 1989. Enrile led the negotiations with the rebel leaders during the 1989 Philippine coup attempt.
 
Enrile was appointed Commanding General of the Philippine Army in 1991. He served as Vice Chief of Staff of the Armed Forces of the Philippines before being appointed by then Fidel Ramos as Chief of Staff of the Armed Forces of the Philippines on April 12, 1994.  He served as AFP Chief until November 30, 1996, after President Ramos extended his appointment as AFP Chief of Staff.

Awards in military service
  Philippine Republic Presidential Unit Citation
   Distinguished Service Star
  Distinguished Conduct Star
  Anti-dissidence Campaign Medal
  Luzon Anti Dissidence Campaign Medal
  Mindanao Anti-dissidence Campaign Medal
  Long Service Medal
  Disaster Relief & Rehabilitation Operation Ribbon
   Silver Wing Medal
  Wounded Personnel Medal

DOTC Secretary
On April 16, 1997, Enrile was appointed as Secretary of the Department of Transportation of the Philippines. He served as DOTC secretary until his untimely demise on January 14, 1998.

Death
Enrile died in January 1998 after his major organs (liver heart, kidney, lungs) were attacked by bacteria. Doctors spent a lot of time explaining to media representatives and live TV cameras that the former AFP chief of staff did not die from the Hong Kong Bird Flu. Enrile, 57, was rushed to the Makati Medical Center Monday after collapsing at home. Doctors said the retired general was in a state of shock when he reached the hospital. An official medical bulletin said Enrile died from complications arising from virulent viral infection, or "multiple organ failure due to septic shock and streptococcal pneumonic bacteraemia." President Ramos expressed his deep condolences for the "untimely demise of a devoted public servant and leader" and attended the wake.

He was interred at the Libingan ng mga Bayani in Taguig.

References

Arturo Enrile's obituary

1940 births
1998 deaths
People from Manila
People from Lucena, Philippines
Philippine Military Academy alumni
Filipino generals
Chairmen of the Joint Chiefs (Philippines)
Secretaries of Transportation of the Philippines
Burials at the Libingan ng mga Bayani
Ramos administration cabinet members